Cordus may mean:

 Aulus Cremutius Cordus, Roman historian
  Euricius Cordus (1486-1535), German intellectual
 Valerius Cordus (1515-1544), German naturalist, son of Euricius
 Quintus Naevius Cordus Sutorius Macro, Roman prefect
 Cordus (weevil), a genus in family Brentinae

See also
 Cordia